Harlem Township may refer to:
 Harlem Township, Stephenson County, Illinois
 Harlem Township, Winnebago County, Illinois
 Harlem Township, Sargent County, North Dakota, in Sargent County, North Dakota
 Harlem Township, Delaware County, Ohio

Township name disambiguation pages